The District Office Manual of Tamil Nadu State Government, India  is the  manual  which contains compendium of instructions to all Tamil Nadu State Government offices as how to transact business in the Government offices. General public are unaware of the office procedure followed in Government offices and this leads to friction, heartburns, frustration and disappointment. This manual, a public document, published by Government of Tamil Nadu and available for sale in Government book depots and some private book stalls, gives complete details of how to transact business in Government offices with very clearly delineated accountability and responsibility norms  with citations of Government Orders.

Details are available  about the instruction given to Government officials as  how to receive a petition, how to write a petition to government offices and what government officers should do on receiving them etc. It also gives details of various registers to be maintained,  who should maintain them and for what purpose. It also codifies the behaviour mode  between superior and subordinate officers in the conduct of official business. It has two parts. The first part deals with attendance, general discipline, organisation of Office, the office system, how letters received to be accounted for in the Office, etc. The second part deals specifically with Collectors Office, Revenue divisional office etc.

Introduction 
The introductory paragraph says that every member of the establishment will be supplied with a copy of this book and he must make himself thoroughly conversant with the rules contained in it. The plea of ignorance will never be accepted as an excuse for disobeying them. The contents of the manual is backed by various Government orders issued from time to time appropriately referenced.  The manual says that it is the duty of Head of office to see that every member in his office knows and understands the rules, keeps his copy of them corrected, updated and hand it over to his successor on leaving office

Hours of attendance 
All members of establishment are expected to attend office from 10:00 AM to 5:45 PM. (Corrected to include latest orders) on all weekdays except recognized holidays. Heads of officers must set an example for the others by themselves attending punctually.  Lunch interval of half an hour is given between 1 and 3 PM. but they should leave only in turns after making suitable  arrangements and they should not leave all at a time.

Attendance register 
An attendance register in the prescribed form will be maintained and kept in the custody of the manager. There will be a late attendance register. 
The staff are, on no account to take papers out of office in order to work at home. As a general rule work on Sundays and other holidays is prohibited. For handling urgent work on holidays proper arrangements will be made.

Casual leave 
Casual Leave  will be granted under such rules and conditions as laid down from time to time. It will not be granted on vague  and general grounds such as ‘urgent private affairs’ or ‘for a certain ceremony’. The purpose for which leave is required must be stated definitely. Application for leave must be made and orders on them obtained before the leave is taken. The casual leave register should be maintained in the prescribed form. Pages should be allotted to each  official. Compensatory holidays and optional religious holidays should also be mentioned in the casual leave register in a separate portion under separate headings.

General Discipline 
While in office all members of establishment  must behave in a quiet and dignified manner. They  must address other members of establishment courteously. They must attend to their work and not waste the time. They must try to maintain perfect silence and if they have occasion to talk, they will do in low voice so as not to disturb others. They are particularly warned against heinous offence of divulging to outsider any information that may have come to their  knowledge in their  official capacity. 
They must, of course, not accept any presents or remuneration from any visitor or party  nor lay themselves under obligation  to such persons in any other way.

Tidiness and cleanliness of Office.
A waste paper box must be kept within a convenient distance of every member of the staff. Waste paper must be thrown into this and not on the floor. Stationery and records  must be put away tidily in the shelves, are not left lying on the tables and on the top of the shelves  exposed to dust.

Organisation of Office 
The manual suggest the first step to be taken in order to introduce the "Tottanham's System" into any Office is to divide the Office into convenient sections and draw a clear distribution list showing the subjects dealt with by each staff member. To each section, a section letter will be assigned and to each group, subjects dealt with the staff member, a number will be allotted. Fair copying and dispatching section must also be organised under a competent Supervisor.

The system followed in government office is called "Tottanham's System". There will be an office Manager who is otherwise called as "The Sarishtadar"  will exercise supervision and control over all sections and the heads of sections.  He must periodically inspect the Personal Registers and see that they are punctually, neatly and properly maintained. The Office Manager must check any tendency to delay and bring it to the notice of superior officer. He must also find out whether there is any indication that any member of the establishment is obviously unsuited for his work. If any serious delay or other irregularity  comes to light, it is not a sufficient  excuse for the supervisor to say that he  repeatedly warned the offender or urged to deal promptly  with the  file that has been delayed. The supervisor's duty in such cases is to report immediately to superior officer as soon as  he found that his own  admonitions are not proving effective. Should he fail to do so, he cannot be held to have discharged his responsibility.
The office system followed in government offices is called "Tottanham's System" It deals with all arrangements with regard to "routine work" i.e., to such branches of work  as the opening letters, registering, indexing, fair copying and dispatching of correspondence, the receipt of papers into the record room, their arrangement in the record room to store in  safe custody, retrieval when required and destruction when no longer required and so on. 
The manual describes various registers to be maintained in government offices. Some of the important registers are : Distribution Register, Personal Register, New Case Register, Fair copy Register, Special registers etc. All letters received in any government office are serially  numbered and they are registered in the distribution register, duly indicating to whom and to which staff members such a letter is assigned for initiating action. Personal Register is to be maintained by every staff member, which will have complete details of all the letters he has received and the dates of action taken by him. Finally how this letter is disposed of is also indicated in the personal register. This is an important register to assess the performance of every staff  member.  Periodical Register is another register which is helpful in monitoring whether the reports to be sent to various superior officers are promptly sent. This register has the details of the periodical reports, their subjects, the periodicity and to whom they are to be sent.  The special register will have details of important references marked as Special by Head of Office  and to be dealt with separately.

Opening of Letters 
It is desirable that whenever possible the letters received  should be opened in the presence of head of office. The letters will then be sorted out and distributed to the concerned sections after duly registering them in the Distribution Register. The staff member who receives these letters should register them at once in their Personal Register. They should take action immediately if the letter received is new. The letter received will be kept in the current file i.e. along with the original letters received.  He will put up a note to his superior officer indicating what is the reference received and what action need to be pursued. In case the letter received relates to already existing file, he must record this in his personal register  and restore the letter in the appropriate file and pursue action.

Disposals 
How long should a government office retain a closed file?. There are different kinds of disposals in government system. Certain files need not be retained at all whereas certain others need to retained. Depending on the importance of the matter, Government has evolved a system retaining them with proper classification. "N. Dis" indicates nil disposal which means that it need not be retained and the original can be returned. If it is marked as " K. Dis" it means, it has to be kept for three years and later it can be destroyed. "L. Dis." means it can be destroyed after 1 year . Once the letter is approved by competent authority it'll be fair copied in the fair copying section and immediately dispatched. There is a register in which all these entries are made then and there. The arrangements for storing these records also to be made in every Office. There will be a record clerk who is in charge of storing files and retrieving them.

The system evolved and practiced in Governmental offices is comprehensive. Its efficiency depends on the person implementing it. It ensures that every single paper received in government office is accounted for properly.

References

External links 
 https://www.apct.gov.in/apportal/others/Distofficemanual.pdf ( seen on 18-07-2016 )
 https://web.archive.org/web/20160708153208/http://www.forests.tn.nic.in/publicutilities/Departmental%20books.html ( seen on 18-07-2016)
 https://archive.org/details/district-office-manual-part-i-and-ii-tamilnadu (seen on 2021-02-13)

Government of Tamil Nadu